L'Île d'Anticosti is a municipality in the Minganie Regional County Municipality in the Côte-Nord region of Quebec.  Its territory coincides with Anticosti Island, a large island in the Gulf of Saint Lawrence.

Within the municipality, the main populated area is Port-Menier.

Officially the municipality was formed first in 1902 when Anticosti Island was separated from the County of Saguenay. But since the entire island was privately owned, there was no elected council to preside over the islanders, who were either servants of the landlord or employees of logging companies. Even after the island was owned again by the provincial government in 1974, it took another decade to put a working municipal organization in place. On January 31, 1984, the first council was finally sworn in.

Communities

Port-Menier

The village of Port-Menier is the hub of the island. Its population doubles in the summer with seasonal workers and tourists. The economic mainstays are outdoor tourism and forestry/logging. Services available in Port-Menier are: general and grocery stores, gas station, banking, restaurant, and lodging.

Demographics

Population

Language

Time zone
Anticosti Island is bisected by the 63rd meridian west, and as a result, the eastern part of the municipality is officially within the AST legislated time zone boundary.  However, in practice, all of L'Île-d'Anticosti observes the Eastern Time Zone (EST and EDT).

Education
Commission scolaire du Littoral operates St-Joseph School (francophone) in Port-Menier.

See also
 List of municipalities in Quebec

References

Municipalities in Quebec
Incorporated places in Côte-Nord
Anticosti Island